George Batchelder may refer to:
 George Batchelder, owner of the George Batchelder House in Reading, Massachusetts
 George A. Batchelder (1907–1975), American politician from Arizona
 George Washington Batchelder (1826–1910), American politician from Minnesota